Hui or Huy was an ancient Egyptian name, frequently a nickname for Amenhotep.

Famous bearers:
 Huy, priestess during the Eighteenth dynasty, mother-in-law of Thutmose III
 Huy, High Priest of Ptah during the reign of Ramesses II
 Huy, viceroy of Kush during the reign of Ramesses II
 Amenhotep called Huy, a vizier of Amenhotep III
 Amenhotep called Huy, High Steward of Memphis during Amenhotep III
 Amenhotep called Huy, viceroy of Kush under Tutankhamen

Ancient Egyptian given names